Shorea albida (called, along with some other species in the genus Shorea, light red meranti) is a species of tree in the family Dipterocarpaceae. It is endemic to Borneo.

Description
Shorea albida can grow up to 30 meters high.

Range and habitat
Shorea albida is found in Brunei, Sarawak state of Malaysia, and the Indonesian province of West Kalimantan. The largest subpopulation is in Brunei, and its range is limited in West Kalimantan.

Shorea albida can be a dominant canopy tree in peat swamp forests. It is also found in lower montane forests.

Conservation
The species' Brunei habitat is not threatened, and its population in the country is considered stable. It is found in four protected areas in Sarawak, but outside those areas its population continues declining from deforestation and fire. The species' population in Indonesia is estimated to have declined by 80% over the last three generations, and is expected to decline further as a result of habitat loss. Its conservation status is assessed as vulnerable.

References

albida
Endemic flora of Borneo
Trees of Borneo
Taxonomy articles created by Polbot